The Lego Ninjago Movie is a 2017 computer-animated martial arts comedy film produced by Warner Animation Group, RatPac Entertainment, Lego System A/S, Lin Pictures, Lord Miller Productions, and Vertigo Entertainment, and distributed by Warner Bros. Pictures. Based on the toy line of the same name, it was directed by Charlie Bean, Paul Fisher, and Bob Logan (in their feature directorial debuts) from a screenplay by Logan, Fisher, William Wheeler, Tom Wheeler, Jared Stern, and John Whittington. It is the first theatrical film to be based on an original Lego property and the third installment in The Lego Movie franchise as well as its second spin-off. The film stars the voices of Dave Franco, Michael Pena, Kumail Nanjiani, Abbi Jacobson, Zach Woods, Fred Armisen, Justin Theroux and Olivia Munn, as well as a live-action role by Jackie Chan (who also voiced Wu in the film). The film focuses on a young teenage ninja Lloyd Garmadon, as he attempts to accept the truth about his villainous father and learn what it truly means to be a ninja warrior as a new threat emerges to endanger his homeland.

An animated feature film based on Ninjago was announced in September 2013 by Warner Bros., with The Hageman Brothers writing the adaptation while Bean was hired to direct the film with Phil Lord and Christopher Miller, Dan Lin and Roy Lee producing. By May 2014, following the success of The Lego Movie, Warner Bros. announced that the film were originally released in September 2016, which later changed to September 2017 in April 2015. The cast were signed in to voice the characters in 2016, from June to August. As with The Lego Movie and The Lego Batman Movie, the animation was provided by Animal Logic. Mark Mothersbaugh, who composed The Lego Movie, composed the film's musical score, with several artists performing new original songs for the film.

A collaboration between production houses from the United States and Denmark, The Lego Ninjago Movie was released in the United States on September 22, 2017, in 2D, 3D, and Dolby Cinema formats. The film received mixed reviews from critics and grossed only $123.1 million worldwide against its $70 million budget.

Plot

A young boy meets the mysterious owner of a relic shop, Mr. Liu, who tells him the story of Ninjago, a city within the LEGO universe. It is frequently terrorized by the evil warlord Garmadon and his army of sea life-themed henchmen. Garmadon's constant attacks backfire on his son Lloyd, who is despised by everyone in Ninjago City for his relation to Garmadon, putting him under emotional stress. Unbeknownst to everyone, Lloyd is the Green Ninja, the leader of a ninja team comprising Kai, Cole, Jay, Zane, Nya, and their master Wu (Garmadon's brother), who always stop Garmadon from taking over Ninjago by fighting with mechs. When Garmadon is again unsuccessful at conquering Ninjago, his tech division shows him a giant new mech.

Following their victory, Wu tells the ninja that only their "unique element" will permanently vanquish Garmadon. Lloyd is frustrated to learn his element is "green" while Kai has fire, Cole has earth, Jay has lightning, Zane has ice, and Nya has water. Wu also mentions the "Ultimate Weapon", giving Lloyd new hope of stopping Garmadon, despite Wu warning them that nobody can ever use the device. The next day, Garmadon attacks Ninjago with his new mech and this time defeats Lloyd. As Garmadon gloats, Lloyd returns with the Ultimate Weapon and fires it, only to discover it is actually a laser pointer that attracts a live-action cat named Meowthra. Garmadon points the laser at the ninja's mechs, which the cat destroys, but Lloyd breaks the laser pointer. As Garmadon celebrates his victory, Lloyd unmasks himself and denounces his father, leaving Garmadon confused.

Lloyd meets up with his friends and Wu, who tells them they must use the "Ultimate, Ultimate Weapon" to stop Meowthra from destroying Ninjago, which can be found on the other side of Ninjago Island. Garmadon overhears the conversation, follows close behind, and intercepts the ninja. Wu and Garmadon fight, and although the former manages to trap the latter in a cage, he falls off a bridge into the river below. Before being swept away, Wu tells the ninja they must find "inner peace". The ninja continue on with Garmadon leading them, much to Lloyd's annoyance. Despite this, the two bond throughout their journey, while the ninja learn not to rely solely on their mechs to fight. The group survives an encounter with Garmadon's fired generals, and Garmadon teaches Lloyd to throw.

They eventually crash down onto the Temple of Fragile Foundations, Garmadon's childhood home. He tells Lloyd that his mother, Koko, was once a warrior named Lady Iron Dragon and that he wishes he had stayed with them after deciding to conquer Ninjago, but he couldn't change his ways so they had to stay apart. The ninja find the Ultimate, Ultimate Weapon, a chest consisting of a set of LEGO pieces that resemble their elemental powers, only to have it stolen by Garmadon, who remains resolute in taking over the city after Lloyd rejects his offer to replace a mutinous general. In an unexpected turnaround, Garmadon locks the ninja inside the temple as it begins to collapse. Lloyd realizes that "inner peace" means that they must unleash their elemental power, and they escape from the collapsing temple. As they fall off a cliff, Wu saves them with the ninja's flying ship, the Destiny's Bounty, and they head back to Ninjago City.

Garmadon tries to defeat Meowthra with the Ultimate, Ultimate Weapon, only to end up eaten by the cat. Lloyd and the others arrive and begin fighting Garmadon's army. As Lloyd approaches Meowthra, he reveals to everyone that he is the Green Ninja and realizes that "green" means life and that his element is what connects the ninja and his family together. He comforts and tames Meowthra and apologizes to Garmadon profusely, saying that he forgives him. Garmadon cries tears of fire, causing Meowthra to vomit him out. After Lloyd and Garmadon reconcile, Meowthra becomes the mascot of Ninjago and Lloyd is hailed as a hero.

As Mr. Liu finishes his story about Ninjago, he informs the boy that he has the potential to be a great ninja warrior and tells him that they will start training at dawn.

Cast

 Dave Franco as Lloyd Garmadon, the Green Ninja, leader of the Secret Ninja Force, Lord Garmadon and Koko's son and Master Wu's nephew.
 Michael Peña as Kai, the hotheaded red Ninja of Fire and Nya's brother.
 Fred Armisen as Cole, the laid-back music-loving black Ninja of Earth.
 Kumail Nanjiani as Jay, the quiet and cautious blue Ninja of Lightning.
 Zach Woods as Zane, the robotic white Ninja of Ice.
 Abbi Jacobson as Nya, the strong silver Ninja of Water, Kai's sister, and Jay's crush.
 Jackie Chan as Master Wu, the wisecracking leader of the group, Lord Garmadon's brother and Lloyd's uncle. 
 Chan also plays Mr. Liu, an elderly shopkeeper who appears in the live-action part of the film.
 Justin Theroux as Lord Garmadon, the Lord of Evil, an evil warlord, the father of Lloyd, the ex-husband of Koko and the brother of Master Wu.
 Olivia Munn as Koko, Lord Garmadon's ex-wife and Lloyd's mother. She was formerly known as the legendary "Lady Iron Dragon" when she worked as a warrior-queen.
 Randall Park and Retta as Chen and Maggie, the cheerleaders at Ninjago High School who bully Lloyd.
 Constance Wu as the Mayor of Ninjago.
 Charlyne Yi and Vanara Taing as Terri and Asimov, the IT Nerds working for Lord Garmadon.
 Chris Hardwick as a radio DJ working in Ninjago City.
 Robin Roberts as herself, a Lego caricature of the newscaster. In the UK version, she is replaced by Kate Garraway.
 Michael Strahan as himself, a Lego caricature of the known media personality and former New York Giants defensive end. In the UK version, he is replaced by Ben Shephard.
 David Burrows as a fuchsia ninja who has the "element of surprise."
 Alex Kauffman as Ninja Computer.
 Ali Wong as General Olivia, the fish-themed general of Garmadon's Shark Army.
 Todd Hansen as General Omar, the shark-themed general of Garmadon's Shark Army. 
 Doug Nicholas as General Jollty, the jellyfish-themed general of Garmadon's Shark Army.
 Bobby Lee as the owner of a pilates studio in Ninjago City.
 Laura Kightlinger as Mrs. Laudita, a teacher at Ninjago High School.
 Pearl and Ruby as Meowthra, a live-action cat that terrorizes Ninjago.
 Kaan Guldur as a young boy who appears at the live-action part of the film, where he is told the story of Ninjago by Mr. Liu.

Production
On September 17, 2013, Warner Bros. announced that it was developing an animated Ninjago film based on the Lego toy line Lego Ninjago. The Hageman Brothers, who wrote the Ninjago: Masters of Spinjitzu show and co-wrote the story of The Lego Movie, would write the adaptation. Charlie Bean was announced as director, and The Lego Movie team of Dan Lin, Roy Lee, and Phil Lord and Chris Miller as producers. On June 27, 2016, the film's voice cast was announced, including Dave Franco, Michael Peña, Kumail Nanjiani, Zach Woods, Fred Armisen, Jackie Chan, and Abbi Jacobson. Additional voice cast included Justin Theroux as Lord Garmadon and Olivia Munn as Koko.

Filming
In order to give the film a more believable father-son atmosphere, Dave Franco and Justin Theroux recorded most of their lines where their characters interact with each other together in a single recording studio. During the process, Franco openly admitted he found himself uncontrollably crying while recording some of his lines. Franco stated "I found myself getting caught up in the moment and basically crying harder than I have in any live-action movie I've ever been in".

Jackie Chan choreographed all of Master Wu's fight scenes in live action before they were recreated in animation for the film. Chan found the experience new to him as well as interesting. "Everything the stunt team does, the ninja do also", Chan commented.

Music

Mark Mothersbaugh, who composed the score for The Lego Movie, returned to score The Lego Ninjago Movie. Along with the score, the album includes Master Wu's flute music, played by Greg Pattillo, and five new songs created for the movie ("Heroes", "Operation New Me", "It's Garmadon", "Found My Place", and "Dance of Doom"). The song "Bad Blood" by Taylor Swift featuring Kendrick Lamar appeared in the film's trailers but is not included on the score album; other pop songs in the film are likewise not included. One of Wu's flute music is a cover of (It's the) Hard Knock Life from Annie.

Release
The Lego Ninjago Movie premiered at the Regency Village Theater on September 16, 2017, before it was widely released in the United States by Warner Bros. Pictures on September 22, 2017, in 3D, RealD 3D, and Dolby Cinema. It was originally scheduled for a September 23, 2016 release. The film was released in Denmark on September 21, 2017. It was released in the Philippines on September 27, 2017.

A short film, The Master, that promoted the feature film was shown in front of screenings of Storks, which took the original September 23 release date. On February 8, 2017, the first trailer was released. The trailer was shown in front of screenings of The Lego Batman Movie. On July 22, 2017, a second trailer for the film was shown as part of San Diego Comic-Con and released on YouTube later in the day. Both trailers feature the song "Bad Blood" by Taylor Swift, with the second trailer also featuring "It Must Have Been Love" by Roxette, "Ain't Gonna Die Tonight" by Macklemore and "I Wanna Go Out" by American Authors.

Marketing 
Over twenty Lego sets inspired by scenes from the film were released for the film including a set of Collectible Minifigures. A video game by TT Fusion based on the film, The Lego Ninjago Movie Video Game, was released on September 22, 2017, for Windows PC, Nintendo Switch, PlayStation 4 and Xbox One. The game is similar to previous Lego games, with some new features such as multiplayer and new techniques.

Home media
The Lego Ninjago Movie was released on Digital HD on December 12, 2017, and DVD, Blu-ray, Blu-ray 3D, and 4K Blu-ray on December 19, 2017, by Warner Bros. Home Entertainment.

Video game

Based on The Lego Ninjago Movie, it was released for Microsoft Windows, Nintendo Switch, PlayStation 4, and Xbox One, alongside the film, in North America on 22 September 2017, and worldwide on 20 October 2017. It serves as the second spin-off video game and the third game in The Lego Movie franchise.

Sets

Reception

Box office
The Lego Ninjago Movie grossed $59.3 million in the United States and Canada, and $63.8 million in other territories, for a worldwide total of $123 million against a $70 million budget.

In North America, the film was released alongside Kingsman: The Golden Circle and Friend Request. Various tracking services had the film projected to gross anywhere from $27–44 million from 4,047 theaters in its opening weekend. After making $5.8 million on its first day, weekend projections were lowered to $21 million. It ended up debuting to $21.2 million, finishing third at the box office and ranking as the lowest opening of the Lego franchise by over 50%.

Critical response
The site's critical consensus reads, "Despite ample charm and a few solid gags, The Lego Ninjago Movie suggests this franchise's formula isn't clicking like it used to." On Metacritic, the film has a weighted average score of 55 out of 100 based on 33 critics, indicating "mixed or average reviews". Audiences polled by CinemaScore gave the film an average grade of "B+" on an A+ to F scale.

Andrew Barker of Variety wrote: "Plenty entertaining and occasionally very funny, Ninjago nonetheless displays symptoms of diminishing returns, and Lego might want to shuffle its pieces a bit before building yet another film with this same model."

Accolades

References

External links

 
 Official website at Lego.com
 

2017 films
2017 3D films
2017 action comedy films
2017 computer-animated films
2017 directorial debut films
2017 martial arts films
2017 science fiction action films
3D animated films
2010s American animated films
2010s animated superhero films
2010s children's comedy films
2010s English-language films
2017 fantasy films
2010s martial arts comedy films
American 3D films
American action comedy films
American children's animated adventure films
American children's animated comedy films
American children's animated fantasy films
American computer-animated films
American martial arts comedy films
American fantasy adventure films
American films with live action and animation
American science fantasy films
Animated films about cats
Animated films based on animated series
Film spin-offs
Films about bullying
Films about dysfunctional families
Films about father–son relationships
Films about sentient toys
Films about toys
Films based on television series
Films based on toys
Films directed by Charlie Bean (filmmaker)
Films produced by Roy Lee
Films produced by Dan Lin
Films produced by Phil Lord and Christopher Miller
Films scored by Mark Mothersbaugh
Films set on fictional islands
Films with screenplays by The Hageman Brothers
Films with screenplays by Jared Stern
Films with screenplays by John Whittington (screenwriter)
Ninjago
Movie
Ninja films
Superhero comedy films
Warner Bros. films
Warner Bros. Animation animated films
Warner Bros. animated films
Warner Animation Group films
Animal Logic films
Dune Entertainment films
Vertigo Entertainment films
4DX films